Events from the year 1508 in art.

Events
 December - Michelangelo begins painting the Sistine Chapel ceiling in the Holy See of Rome on a commission by Pope Julius II (signed May 10). This year also he completes a bronze statue of the Pope for San Petronio Basilica in Bologna, destroyed in 1511.

Works

 Fra Bartolomeo - Holy Father, St. Mary Magdalene and St. Catherine of Siena
 Vittore Carpaccio - The Presentation of the Virgin (approximate date)
 Albrecht Dürer
Heller Altarpiece (possible date)
Martyrdom of the Ten Thousand
 Giorgione (approximate dates)
Shepherd with a Flute
The Tempest
La Vecchia (Old Woman)
Lorenzo Lotto
Madonna with Child between Sts. Flavian and Onuphrius
Recanati Polyptych
 Raphael
Colonna Madonna
Niccolini-Cowper Madonna
The Tempi Madonna
 Lucas van Leyden – Mohammed and the Murdered Monk (engraving)

Births

November 25 - Cristofano Gherardi, Italian Mannerist painter (died 1556)
 date unknown
Livio Agresti, Italian painter, one of the members of the "Forlì painting school" (died 1580)
Pieter Aertsen, Dutch historical painter (died 1575)
Antonio da Trento, Italian artist especially of woodcuts (died 1550)
Girolamo da Treviso, Italian painter (died 1544)
Giovanni Bernardo Lama, Italian painter (died 1579)
Qian Gu, Chinese landscape painter during the Ming Dynasty (died c.1578)
1508/1510: Lodovico Dolce, Italian art theorist (died 1568)
1507/1508: Wenzel Jamnitzer, Northern Mannerist goldsmith, artist, and printmaker in etching (died 1585)

Deaths
 Giovanni Ambrogio de Predis, Italian Renaissance painter from Milan (born 1455)
 Wu Wei, Chinese landscape painter during the Ming Dynasty (born 1459)
 1508/1509: Bernt Notke, German painter and sculptor (born 1435)

 
Years of the 16th century in art
1500s in art